Syndy Emade   (born Elone Synthia Emade on 21 November 1993) is a Cameroonian actress, model and movie producer. She is the Cameroonian brand ambassador for the app InstaVoice Celeb. She is the owner of Blue Rain Entertainment, a movie production company. She has produced a couple of movies amongst which are A Man for the Weekend and Rose on The Grave. She made her international career debut  in the Nigerian film industry (Nollywood) in 2016, in the movie “Why I Hate Sunshine”. In  2017, she was listed second most active Cameroonian actress, according  to an online  movie streaming  channel Njoka TV for African entertainment. She was awarded best Cameroonian actress in Scoos Academy Award 2017. She won the 2014 edition Cameroon Miss Heritage Award.

Career

Emade's debut movie appearance was in the movie “Obsession” which was released in 2010. She is the founder and chair lady of BLUE RAIN Entertainment. Her recent work in 2017 includes A Man For The Weekend featuring Nigerian Nollywood star Alexx Ekubo.

Personal Life 
Syndy Emade lives a very private life and keeps her personal activities away from the public. She is mother to a four year old daughter.

Selected filmography

2022 

 Kuvah

2021 
 4th Generation

2019 
 Broken

2018 
 Little Cindy

2017 
 A Man for the Weekend

2016 
 Bad Angel (TV series)
 The Soldier's Wife
 House Mate
 Smokescreen
 Before You Say Yes I Do
 Chasing Tails

2015 
 Die Another Day
 A Kiss from Rose

2014 
 Why I Hate Sunshine
 Rose on the Grave
 Different Kind of Men (2013)
 Pink Poison with Epule Jeffrey (2012)
' 'Entangled Obsession'' (2010)

Awards and recognition

See also 

List of Cameroonian actors
Cinema of Cameroon

References

External links
 Facebook page
 

1993 births
Living people
Cameroonian film directors
Cameroonian actresses